Store Kongensgade 62 is a listed property in central Copenhagen, Denmark.

History

Origins 
The site was in the late 17th century part of a larger property. This property was by  1689  as No. 130 in St. Ann's East Quarter owned by Hans Christoffersen Richter. In the new cadastre of 1756, it was listed as No. 241. It was by then owned by councilman Abraham Falch.

In the new cadastre of 1806, the property was listed as No. 245. It was by then owned by Justitsråd Binck's widow.

The current building on the site was constructed in 1807 by master mason and captain in the fire corps Georg Adam Gross (c.1748-1809). In 1810, it was acquired by the wealthy ship captain and merchant John Christmas. He owned it until his death in 1822. He was from 1813 also the owner of the country house Rolighed in Skodsborg.

Puggaard family 

The wealthy merchant Hans Puggaard purchased the property in 1830 and owned it until his death in 1865. He lived there with his wife Bolette Puggarrd. Two of her brothers were also residents in the building at different times. Johannes Hage (1800–1837), the editor of the magazine Fædrelandet, was also a resident in the building around 1836. Hother Hage (1816–1873) a National Liberal politician, lived in the building in 1839 and again in 1855. Hans and Bolette Puggaard's daughter Maria Puggaard married Orla Lehmann and they lived in the building in 1863.

The military officer and later Defense Minister Peter Frederik Steinmann (1812–1894) was also a resident in the building in 1836.

Puggaard's son Rudolph was at the time of the 1845 census still among the residents in the building. Commandant of Copenhagen  (1868-1860) was together with his wife and an unmarried daughter also among the residents. Puggaard's other tenants at the time of the 1845 census were cook for the Russian envoy Jean Henry Oluf Ganiel (born 1817), and flour merchant Johan Peter Alpers (born 1806).

The paper manufacturer Johan Christian Drewsen had his last home in the building in 1850–51.

Architecture 

The building consists of three stories over a high cellar and is six bays wide. A gateway on the left side of the building opens to a narrow courtyard lined by a side wing from 1807 to the right and a rear wing from 1807 to the left.

Today 
Amadeus, a café and restaurant, is based in the ground floor. VOCE, a private dining comcept, is based on the third floor.

References

External links 

Buildings and structures associated with the Puggaard family
Houses completed in 1807
Listed residential buildings in Copenhagen